Richard P. Rinaldi (born August 3, 1949) is an American former professional basketball player who played for the Baltimore Bullets.

Born in Poughkeepsie, New York, Rinaldi attended F.D. Roosevelt High School in Hyde Park, New York and was a guard at St. Peter's College, where he played from 1967–71. As a senior at St. Peter's in 1970–71, Rinaldi averaged 28.6 points per game, which was the nation's sixth-highest scoring average that season.

Rinaldi was selected 43rd overall by the Baltimore Bullets in the 1971 NBA Draft and signed a contract which earned him $33,000 as a rookie. He played in the NBA with the Bullets from 1971–1974. After being cut by the Bullets during the 1973–1974 season in favor of Flynn Robinson and Archie Clark, Rinaldi signed with the New York Nets of the American Basketball Association in November 1973.

After the Nets also released him, he began working in New York as a substitute teacher and then a full time physical education teacher. In 1976, he was invited to play for an American team including Robert Parrish for a tournament in Italy. The strength of his performance earned him a two-year contract with Italian club Mobilgirgi Varese. 

Rinaldi's most successful NBA season came in 1972–73, when he averaged 8.5 points and 2.1 rebounds in 33 games for the Bullets. He ended his professional career in Europe, playing in Italy and Switzerland from 1976–1982.

In 1978, he described the quality of play in the Swiss Basketball League as "between high school seniors and college freshmen." In 1980, he won his third straight scoring title in the Swiss Basketball League while playing for Pallacanestro Bellinzona. He averaged 40.4 points per game over 22 games.

After his playing career, Rinaldi served as a men's college basketball coach in his home county at Dutchess Community College and Vassar College.

Despite his having written a guest article in the Poughkeepsie Journal in 1987 arguing that a "[s]trike by [the] NBA players union would be difficult to justify" because "you can never recoup that lost money," the National Basketball Players Association hired Rinaldi in 2001 to serve as an educational counselor for NBA players. He called the job "the best thing to happen to me professionally" since his playing career. At the time, he was living in Skippack, Pennsylvania. , Rinaldi worked for the National Basketball Players Association, counseling players on the transition to post-basketball careers.

References

1949 births
Living people
American expatriate basketball people in Italy
American expatriate basketball people in Switzerland
American men's basketball players
Baltimore Bullets (1963–1973) draft picks
Baltimore Bullets (1963–1973) players
Basketball players from New York (state)
Capital Bullets players
New York Nets players
Saint Peter's Peacocks men's basketball players
Shooting guards
Sportspeople from Poughkeepsie, New York
Pallacanestro Varese players
American people of Italian descent
College men's basketball coaches in the United States
Junior college men's basketball coaches in the United States